Chéron is a French surname. Notable people with the surname include:

 Aimée Julie Cheron (1821–c.1890), French painter
 André Cheron (1880–1952), American character actor
 André Chéron (1895–1980), French chess player
 Élisabeth Sophie Chéron (1648–1711), French painter
 François Chéron (1764–1829), one of the Administrators of the Comédie-Française
 Louis Chéron (1660–1725), French painter, and a founder of the St. Martin's Lane Academy, London
 Pierre Nicholas Le Chéron d'Incarville (1706–1757), French Jesuit and amateur botanist
 Louis-Claude Chéron de La Bruyère (1758–1807), French playwright, translator and politician

See also
Cheron, a fictional planet in the Star Trek episode "Let That Be Your Last Battlefield"
Saint-Chéron (disambiguation)

French-language surnames